The Victorio Peak Formation is a geologic formation found in the Delaware Basin in Texas and New Mexico. It preserves fossils dating back to the Leonardian Age of the Permian Period.

Description
The base of the formation is largely concealed in the subsurface, and the formation is overlain by the Cutoff Shale. The formation grades laterally to the southeast into the Bone Spring Formation, representing the change from shallow shelf carbonate deposition to deep marine carbonate deposition. To the northwest, the Victorio Peak Formation grades into the Yeso Group and the lower part of the San Andres Formation.

Fossils
The formation contains fossil brachiopods, include Productus ivesii, Dichtyoclostus, and Neospirifer,  fusulinids such as Parafusilina, crinoids, corals, and euomphalid
gastropods characteristic of the Leonardian.

History of investigation
The formation was first designated the Victorio Peak Member of the (now-abandoned) Leonard Formation by King and King in 1929. It was reassigned as the Victorio Peak Member of the Bone Spring Formation by King in 1942, and finally removed as its own formation by Hay-Roe in 1957.

Economic geology

See also
 List of fossiliferous stratigraphic units in New Mexico
 List of fossiliferous stratigraphic units in Texas

Footnotes

References
 
 
 
 
 
 

Permian geology of Texas
Permian formations of New Mexico